The 1983 Virginia Slims of New Jersey was a women's tennis tournament played on outdoor hard courts at the Ramapo College in Mahwah, New Jersey in the United States that was part of the Category 2 tier of the 1983 Virginia Slims World Championship Series. It was the sixth edition of the tournament and was held from August 22 through August 28, 1983. Sixth-seeded Jo Durie won the singles title and earned $22,000 first-prize money.

Finals

Singles
 Jo Durie defeated  Hana Mandlíková 2–6, 7–5, 6–4
It was Durie's 1st title of the year and the 1st of her career.

Doubles
 Jo Durie /  Sharon Walsh defeated  Rosalyn Fairbank /  Candy Reynolds 4–6, 7–5, 6–3
It was Durie's 3rd title of the year and the 4th of her career. It was Walsh's 5th title of the year and the 16th of her career.

Prize money

References

External links
 ITF tournament edition details

Virginia Slims of New Jersey
WTA New Jersey
1983 in sports in New Jersey
1983 in American tennis
August 1983 sports events in the United States